Ebrahimabad (also Romanized as Ebrāhīmābād and Ibrāhīmābād) is a village in Takht-e Jolgeh Rural District, in the Central District of Firuzeh County, Razavi Khorasan Province, Iran. At the 2006 census, its population was 173, in 47 families.

References 

Populated places in Firuzeh County